Speak No Evil is a jazz album recorded by Buddy Rich "and the Big Band Machine" (referring to Buddy Rich's big band). It was released in 1976 and was Rich's first release for RCA Records since 1972's Stick It.

Track listing
LP side A:
"Speak No Evil" (Richard Evans) – 3:44	
"Yearnin' Learnin'" (Charles Stepney, Maurice White, Philip Bailey) – 5:38	
Medley – 11:00
"Storm at Sunup" (Gino Vannelli) – 6:37	
"Love Me Now" (Gino Vannelli) – 4:23	
LP side B:
"Fight the Power" (Chris Jasper, Ernie Isley, Marvin Isley, O'Kelly Isley, Ronald Isley, Rudolph Isley) – 6:00	
"They Just Can't Stop It (The Games People Play)" (Bruce Hawes, Charles Simmons, Joseph Jefferson) – 3:55	
"Sophisticated Lady (She's a Different Lady)" (Chuck Jackson, Marvin Yancy, Natalie Cole) – 3:04	
"Sneakin' Up Behind You" (David Sanborn, Don Grolnick, Michael Brecker, Randy Brecker, Will Lee) – 3:21	
"How Long (Betcha' Got a Chick on the Side)" (Anita Pointer, Bonnie Pointer, June Pointer, Ruth Pointer, David Rubinson) – 3:51

Personnel
Buddy Rich – drums
Bob Cranshaw – bass
Morris Jennings – drums and percussion
Ross Traut – guitar
Kenny Barron – electric piano 
Jerry Dodgion – alto saxophone
Dave Tofani – alto saxophone
Joe Farrell – tenor saxophone
Steve Marcus – tenor saxophone
Turk Mauro – baritone saxophone
Danny Moore – trumpet
Victor Paz – trumpet
Lew Soloff – trumpet
Jon Faddis – trumpet
Janice Robinson – trombone
Wayne Andre – trombone
Tom "Bones" Malone – trombone
David Taylor – bass trombone
Howard Johnson – tuba
Vivian Cherry – vocals 
Lani Groves – vocals
Rhetta Hughes – vocals

References

RCA AFL1-1503, APL1-1503
Speak No Evil at discogs.com

1976 albums
Buddy Rich albums
RCA Records albums